Edentulina usambarensis a species of air-breathing land snail, a terrestrial pulmonate gastropod mollusk in the family Streptaxidae.

This species is endemic to Tanzania.

References

Streptaxidae
Gastropods of Africa
Invertebrates of Tanzania
Endemic fauna of Tanzania
Taxa named by Joseph Charles Bequaert
Taxa named by William J. Clench
Taxonomy articles created by Polbot